Miha Remec [míha rémec, IPA mˈiha ɹeːmet͡s] (born August 10, 1928 in Ptuj, Kingdom of Serbs, Croats and Slovenes (now Slovenia), died 2020) was a Slovene author known for his science fiction works. He was a two-time winner of the SFERA Award.

Novels 
 Stone of Truth (1957)
 Solstice (1969)
 Cave: Night Among Modern Slovene Dormouse Hunters (1977)
 Recognition: White Widows Dark Hours (1980)
 Iksion: Escape from the Stage (1981)
 Mana: Chronological Records of the Journalist Jurij Jereb (1985)
 The Big Carriage (1986)
 Green Covenant (1989)
 Dandelion Fluff in Space (1989)
 Trapan Chronographies (1997)

Collections 
 Stories from Dragon's Castle (1957)
 Poems from Left Pocket (1981)
 Hunter and Unclean Daughter (1987)
 Astral Lighthouses (1993)

See also 

 List of Slovenians
 Science fiction authors

References

External links
 Miha Remec's home page

1928 births
2020 deaths
Slovenian science fiction writers
Yugoslav science fiction writers
People from Ptuj